Alice Lloyd College is a private work college in Pippa Passes, Kentucky. It was co-founded by the journalist Alice Spencer Geddes Lloyd (a native of Cambridge, Massachusetts) and June Buchanan (a native of New York City) in 1923, at first under the name of Caney Junior College. Founded as an institution to educate leaders in Appalachia locally, it became a  bachelor's degree-granting institution in the early 1980s. Alice Lloyd College is accredited by the Southern Association of Colleges and Schools (SACS).

Academics
, Alice Lloyd College has implemented 18 major degree programs and eight pre-professional programs into its curricula. The student-to-faculty ratio is 20:1.

Ninety-five percent of Alice Lloyd College graduates are accepted into graduate and professional schools. Seventy-five percent of Alice Lloyd College graduates are the first in their families to obtain an undergraduate degree.

Rankings and reputation

Alice Lloyd College was ranked number 7 in Regional Colleges South and number 2 in Best Value Schools, as of the 2018 edition of U.S. News & World Report's rankings. 

In the 2022 edition of U.S. News rankings, Alice Lloyd College was ranked number 21 in Regional Colleges South and number 5 in Best Value Schools.

Student finances and required work
Although Alice Lloyd College does not rely on any direct financial support from the state or federal governments, it does accept students using federal and state student financial aid such as federal Pell Grants. 16 percent of students receive education loans, for an average of approximately $800. According to the Project on Student Debt, each of Alice Lloyd's 2009 graduates carried an average debt of $6,500, which is well below the statewide average of $19,112 and the national average of $24,000. The college, which accepted 262 of 6,337 applicants for the class of 2017, guarantees tuition to full-time students from an area consisting of 108 counties in Central Appalachia.

Students are required to work part-time regardless of financial situation. They are given jobs such as janitorial staff, office assistant, tutor, craft maker, resident advisor, maintenance, grounds or working in the cafeteria (Hunger Din). In addition to on-campus jobs, students can work at off-campus outreach projects. Students are required to work at least 160 hours per semester. The college is one of eight work colleges in the United States and one of two in Kentucky (Berea College being the other) that have mandatory work-study programs.

Students from 108 counties in the Appalachian Mountains region of Kentucky, Ohio, Tennessee, Virginia and West Virginia pay no tuition through the Appalachian Leaders College Scholarship.

Student life
The dormitories house about 600 students, with rental prices averaging $1,900 annually. Alice Lloyd College requires students to live in gender-separated dormitories and only allows the opposite sex into a gender-specific dorm during "open houses," after room checks have been made. Room checks consist of two resident advisors going into each room and making sure that it is clean and it does not contain any illegal substances. The college is located in Knott County, Kentucky, a dry county, thus alcoholic beverages are prohibited.

Professional dress is required of all students on central campus until 2:00 p.m. every Tuesday and for all convocation programs.

While this college is not affiliated with any religious denomination, the college's mission statement emphasizes the role of Christian values. In addition, the college offers coursework in religion and has a chapter of Baptist Collegiate Ministries.

The college choir is called the "Voices of Appalachia." The choir, formed in 1962, holds a tour annually in the spring, performing hymns and ballads. The choir has made several media appearances, including NBC's Today and CBS News Sunday Morning.

The college offers a series of speakers and events called convocations. Students are required to attend six convocations per semester.

Campus
The Commodore Slone Building, at one time housing the science program and most recently the June Buchanan School, the college's K-12 prep school, was renovated to house the business program. The Business & Technology Center was completed in the fall of 2009 and was dedicated on October 10, 2009.

Caney Cottage Scholarship
The college owns the H.N. and Frances C. Berger Residence Hall, also known as Caney Cottage, an apartment complex near the campus of the University of Kentucky in Lexington. Students who graduate from Alice Lloyd and are accepted into the University of Kentucky's graduate school can apply to live in the Caney Cottage rent, utility and parking free. Those who attend other graduate schools can apply for cash scholarships that go toward tuition costs. After graduate school, scholarship recipients must commit to service in the Appalachian region.

Presidents
Since the death of Alice Lloyd in 1962, five men have taken the position of president of the Alice Lloyd College:

Athletics
The Alice Lloyd athletic teams are called the Eagles. The college is a member of the National Association of Intercollegiate Athletics (NAIA), primarily competing in the River States Conference (RSC; formerly known as the Kentucky Intercollegiate Athletic Conference (KIAC) until after the 2015–16 school year) since the 2005–06 academic year; which they were a member on a previous stint from 1983–84 to 1991–92. They are also a member of the National Christian College Athletic Association (NCCAA), primarily competing as an independent in the Mid-East Region of the Division I level. The Eagles previously competed in the Appalachian Athletic Conference (AAC) from 2001–02 to 2004–05.

Alice Lloyd competes in 15 intercollegiate athletic sports: Men's sports include baseball, basketball, cross country, golf, soccer and track & field (indoor and outdoor); while women's sports include basketball, cheerleading, cross country, soccer, softball, track & field (indoor and outdoor) and volleyball. Club sports include bass fishing, eSports and men's & women's tennis.

Accomplishments
In 2021, the Alice Lloyd College women's basketball team won the first national championship of any sport in school history, winning the 2021 NCCAA National Tournament.

Notable alumni

 Carl D. Perkins, member of the U.S. House of Representatives, 1949-1984
 Preston Spradlin, basketball head coach at Morehead State, former assistant coach at Kentucky
 Dr. Grady Stumbo (born 1945), A.A., Alice Lloyd College 1965, B.S. University of Kentucky 1967, M.D. University of Kentucky 1971; Rockefeller Award winner; head of Kentucky Democratic Party (1991–1995)

See also
 June Buchanan School, a K-12 prep school on the campus
 WWJD-FM, owned and operated by the college

References

External links 

 
 Official athletics website

 
Appalachian culture in Kentucky
Liberal arts colleges in Kentucky
Buildings and structures in Knott County, Kentucky
Educational institutions established in 1923
Settlement schools
Universities and colleges accredited by the Southern Association of Colleges and Schools
1923 establishments in Kentucky
Education in Knott County, Kentucky
USCAA member institutions
Work colleges
Private universities and colleges in Kentucky